Poliopastea obscura is a moth in the subfamily Arctiinae. It was described by Wallengren in 1860. It is found on Saint Lucia and in Ecuador.

References

Moths described in 1860
Euchromiina